Charles Robert Claxton  (16 November 1903 – 7 March 1992) was the fourth Suffragan Bishop of Warrington later translated to the See of Blackburn.

Life
He was the son of missionary Herbert Bailey Claxton and his wife Frances Ann, and was educated at Monkton Combe School and Queens' College, Cambridge. He was ordained in 1928 and began his ordained ministry with London curacies before becoming Vicar of Holy Trinity, Bristol in 1933.  He was chaplain to the Bishop of Bristol before becoming the Suffragan Bishop of Warrington  and then the diocesan Bishop of Blackburn. 

During his long retirement he was an honorary assistant bishop in the Diocese of Exeter. He died in Cheshire.

References 
4. ‘Memories of Bishop Charles Robert Claxton’ as edited by his grandson, Rev Simon Christopher Tillotson, 1996 https://drive.google.com/file/d/1lbpYKwnckPmIF1tRlx_TtKMkQ9m501aQ/view?usp=sharing

1903 births
People educated at Monkton Combe School
Alumni of Queens' College, Cambridge
Bishops of Warrington
Bishops of Blackburn
20th-century Church of England bishops
1992 deaths